The  2018 Kyoto gubernatorial election was held on 8 April 2018 to elect the next governor of Kyoto. Incumbent Governor Keiji Yamada declared that he was not running for a fifth consecutive term, ending his 16-year tenure in office. This is the first gubernatorial election in Kyoto since the voting age was lowered to 18.

Former bureaucrat Takatoshi Nishiwaki won the election by 55.9% to 44.1% against Kazuhito Fukuyama, amidst the second-lowest ever turnout in a Kyoto gubernatorial election. Nishiwaki vowed to continue the policies of Governor Yamada.

Candidates

Running 
Takatoshi Nishiwaki, former undersecretary for the Reconstruction Agency. (endorsed by LDP, Komeito, DP, CDP, Kibo no To)
Kazuhito Fukuyama, former deputy chairman of the Kyoto Bar Association. (endorsed by JCP)

Declined 
Keiji Yamada, incumbent governor.

Campaign

Results

Breakdown

References

External links

Official websites 
Takatoshi Nishiwaki 
Kazuhito Fukuyama  

2018 elections in Japan
Kyoto gubernational elections
Governors of Kyoto